Pavel Khek (born 6 April 1958) is a Czech weightlifter. He competed in the men's heavyweight II event at the 1980 Summer Olympics.

References

External links
 

1958 births
Living people
Czech male weightlifters
Olympic weightlifters of Czechoslovakia
Weightlifters at the 1980 Summer Olympics
People from Lanškroun
Sportspeople from the Pardubice Region
20th-century Czech people